The Five Senses is a series of five paintings depicting allegories of sight, smell, taste, hearing, and touch, painted by Flemish artist Michaelina Wautier in 1650. Each sense is personified by a young boy. The paintings have been loaned to the Museum of Fine Arts, Boston, by their owners, Rose-Marie and Eijk van Otterloo.

Further reading 

 Michaelina Wautier and the Five Senses: Innovation in 17th-Century Flemish Art. CNA Studies. December 2022.

Citations 

1650 paintings
Paintings by Michaelina Wautier